Nick Taylor (born 18 January 1980) is a wheelchair basketball player. He competed at the 2008 Summer Paralympics playing for the South Africa men's national wheelchair basketball team. He represented Australia at the 2012 Summer Paralympics in wheelchair basketball, being part of the men's team that won silver. After basketball, he successfully took up wheelchair gold and won the inaugural Australian Wheelchair Golf Championship.

Personal
Taylor was born on 18 January 1980 in South Africa. He became a paraplegic as a result of a car accident in South Africa when he was eighteen years old the day before he was supposed to play in a basketball tournament. He attended university in Cape Town and at the University of Texas. In 2005, he moved to Illawarra, New South Wales, participating in a surfing tryout that year. In 2012, he lived in Towradgi, New South Wales.

Basketball
Growing up, Taylor played basketball in South Africa, playing for the South Africa junior national basketball team.  He also played for the Natal representative side and was scheduled to play in the 1998 U19 South African National Championships but was involved in a serious car accident the day before the competition.

Wheelchair basketball

Taylor is a wheelchair basketball player, playing in the shooting guard position. He started playing wheelchair basketball in 2002.  He earned the  2010 Frank Ponta Trophy.

Taylor played wheelchair basketball for the University of Texas in 2002 with future Australian national team teammate Brad Ness.

Taylor played for the Wollongong Roller Hawks in 2005. In 2012, he was still with the Roller Hawks, which won the National Wheelchair Basketball League in 2012. In his team's 75-59 semi-final win over the Wentley Wheelcats, he scored fourteen points. In the Grand Final, he scored fourteen points in a game that was played before a crowd of 500.

Taylor played for the South African men's national wheelchair basketball team at the 2008 Summer Paralympics.

Taylor first made the Australian national team in 2009, making his debut at the Rollers & Gliders World Challenge. He was selected to represent Australia at the 2012 Summer Paralympics in wheelchair basketball. Going into the London Paralympics, his team was ranked number one in the world.  He had to earn his spot as fourteen men had been vying for spots on the team.

At the 2012 Summer Paralympics he was part of the Australian men's wheelchair team that won silver.  He was a member of the Rollers team that won the gold medal at the 2014 Wheelchair Basketball World Championships .

Golf 
In February 2022, Taylor won the inaugural Australian Wheelchair Championship.

References

Paralympic wheelchair basketball players of South Africa
Paralympic wheelchair basketball players of Australia
Paralympic silver medalists for Australia
Wheelchair basketball players at the 2008 Summer Paralympics
Wheelchair basketball players at the 2012 Summer Paralympics
1980 births
Living people
Texas Longhorns athletes
Medalists at the 2012 Summer Paralympics
Paralympic medalists in wheelchair basketball